Crazy Stories is the debut album by CCM duo Serene & Pearl, later known as Considering Lily. It was released on August 31, 1995 by ForeFront Records. The duo was composed of sisters Serene Campbell and Pearl Barrett at the time of this release.

Critical reception

John Bush of AllMusic says, "On their debut album, the sisters duo (born in Australia) play acoustic folk-pop with pleasing harmonies and good songwriting, akin to the Indigo Girls but not merely derivative."

Mike Rimmer reviews the album for Cross Rhythms  and gives it an 9 out of a possible 10 and writes, "Their debut album is confident, upbeat and well produced acoustically tinged pop showcasing Serene & Pearl's blend of pure harmonies which sweep and swoop throughout the album."

Track listing

Track information and credits adapted from AllMusic. Information and credits verified from the album's liner notes.

References

External links
ForeFront Records Official Site

1995 albums
ForeFront Records albums
Contemporary Christian music albums by American artists